Jason Belfon (born 3 July 1990) is a footballer from Grenada who is assigned to W Connection of the Trinidadian TT Pro League as of 2017.

Career

Trinidad and Tobago
Testing for Club Sando of the Trinidadian TT Pro League in 2016, Belfon transferred to the club alongside three other Grenadians.

Inking a deal with 2013–14 TT Pro League champions W Connection in summer 2017, the Grenadian goalkeeper debuted for the 5-time TT Pro League titleholders in a 4-1 defeat to Defence Force.

International
For putting in what was seen as a coruscating performance for Grenada against Puerto Rico, Belfon was awarded as Man of the Match and is considered one of the best goalkeepers in the Caribbean.

References

External links 
 at National-Football-Teams

1990 births
Living people
Grenadian footballers
Grenadian expatriate footballers
Expatriate footballers in Trinidad and Tobago
Grenada international footballers
TT Pro League players
W Connection F.C. players
Association football goalkeepers
Grenada youth international footballers
Grenadian expatriate sportspeople in Trinidad and Tobago
People from Saint Andrew Parish, Grenada
2021 CONCACAF Gold Cup players